The 2018 Toronto municipal election was held on October 22, 2018, to elect a mayor and city councillors in Toronto, Ontario, Canada. Registration for candidates for the office of mayor, councillor, and school board trustee opened on May 1, 2018, and initially closed on July 27, 2018. John Tory won the mayoral election with over 60% of the vote.

To account for the city's growing population, Toronto's council wards underwent a realignment, with the removal of a ward in the west end, three new wards added in the downtown area, and a new ward in North York, expanding the city to 47 wards. However, in July 2018, newly-elected Premier of Ontario Doug Ford introduced legislation to require that Toronto's municipal elections use the same ridings as it does for provincial and federal elections, thus reducing the council to 25 wards. The bill attracted controversy for its intent to change electoral boundaries in the middle of a campaign, and was struck down as unconstitutional in September 2018. However, a stay on this ruling was granted nine days later by the Court of Appeal for Ontario; the three judge panel ruled that Bill 5 is constitutional and that the previous ruling was "dubious", thus reinstating the 25-ward election.

Seventeen Toronto councillors were elected with less than half of all votes cast. One councillor, Cynthia Lai was elected with approximately 27% of the votes cast.

Ward boundary adjustment
The Toronto City Council commissioned an independent review of its ward boundaries in order to account for predicted population growth in specific areas of the city. The consultants recommended the realignment of the city's 44 wards into 47.  Under the 47 ward model, wards would not achieve voter parity until 2026 (when the population projection of 61,000 residents per ward would eventually kick in). The Supreme Court considers voter parity to be crucial to achieving effective representation.

Three new wards were added in downtown, one in North York, while one was removed from Toronto's west end by consolidating 3 wards into 2. Based on the patterns of incumbents shifting to successor wards, the four "new" wards are Ward 20, Ward 21, Ward 25 and Ward 29; the ward reduction in the west end is reflected in the effective merger of what had been designated as Ward 17 and Ward 18 on the preceding map into new Ward 16.

Two city councillors, Giorgio Mammoliti and Justin Di Ciano, along with several Toronto citizens, appealed the redrawing of ward boundaries at the Ontario Municipal Board. The appeal was rejected and new ward boundaries approved in a 38-page decision. Council had to pass a by-law before January 2018 for the boundaries to be changed before the election.

Reduction of wards 
On July 27, 2018, the last day for candidate registration, former councillor and new Ontario Premier Doug Ford introduced the Better Local Government Act, also known as Bill 5. The legislation requires that the Toronto city council align its municipal wards with those of the federal and provincial electoral ridings, thus reducing the size of Toronto's council from 47 to 25 wards. Each council member would serve an area representing an average of 111,000 residents. Ford justified the legislation by stating that the council had "failed to act on the critical issues facing the city", and that expanding it to 47 wards would exacerbate the existing "dysfunction". The province claimed that such a reduction would result in a savings of $25 million over the next four years (in comparison to the city's operating budget of $11.12 billion per-year). The bill also cancelled pending elections for regional chair in the regional municipalities of Niagara and Muskoka, Peel, and York, resetting all four positions back to appointed, rather than elected, offices.

The bill proved controversial, with the official opposition Ontario NDP disputing its intent and considering it an abuse of power, while other groups (including candidates and the Toronto District School Board) contended that the bill undermined the democratic process. Toronto mayor John Tory suggested that such significant changes be subject to a public referendum. Toronto's city council voted 24-17 on a motion to oppose Bill 5 and support Tory's call for a referendum. Tory also criticized Ford for not providing any opportunities to consult with the municipal government over the bill. Ford denied Tory's statement, stating that he had met with Tory and other officials multiple times. Bill 5 was passed August 14, 2018. Rocco Achampong, a candidate for one of the wards removed in the consolidation, launched a legal challenge over the bill in the Ontario Superior Court.

The government of Ontario argued that the larger wards were intended to improve voter parity for the 2018 municipal election (as the 47 ward model would not achieve voter parity until 2026). However, the city asserted that the 25-ward structure provided no better parity than the newly-implemented 47-ward structure, and a consultant argued that the roughly doubled ward population reduced councillors' capacity to serve their communities—another aspect of effective representation. In an affidavit, Toronto city manager Giuliana Carbone disputed the claimed cost savings, stating that it would only save $6 million over four years, taking into account the increased staffing that would be required to operate the larger wards, and the costs incurred by realigning the election to match the new boundaries.

On September 10, 2018, the Better Local Government Act was struck down as unconstitutional by Superior Court Justice Edward Belobaba, ruling that the larger wards infringed on citizens' rights to effective electoral representation, and that unilaterally changing electoral boundaries in the middle of a campaign infringed on candidates' freedom of expression. He explained that "passing a law that changes the city's electoral districts in the middle of its election and undermines the overall fairness of the election is antithetical to the core principles of our democracy", and questioned the province's intent and timing of the legislation. Ford criticized the ruling, contending that its only supporters were a "small group of left-wing councillors looking to continue their free ride on the taxpayers' dollar and a network of activist groups who have entrenched their power under the status quo."

The Ford government introduced the Efficient Local Government Act, also known as Bill 31, on September 12, 2018. The bill would have invoked Section 33 of the Canadian Charter of Rights and Freedoms, also known as the notwithstanding clause, to implement the effects of Bill 5 in defiance of the court ruling. If passed, it would have been the first time that the notwithstanding clause had ever been invoked in Ontario. The Toronto city council voted 29–7 in favour of directing the city solicitor to challenge the new legislation in court, and to ask the federal government to invoke a constitutional clause allowing it to disallow provincial legislation (a mechanism only used once since 1943) should it pass. At a Liberal Party caucus retreat in Saskatoon, Prime Minister Justin Trudeau stated that he would not contribute to the discussions surrounding the sizes of municipal governments in Ontario, as it was "[not] a role that the federal government needs to take on".

On September 19, 2018, the Court of Appeal for Ontario issued a stay on the previous Superior Court decision, ruling that Bill 5 "disrupted the campaigns that were already underway" but "does not limit or restrict any message the candidates wish to convey to voters", and was a "dubious ruling that invalidates legislation duly passed by the legislature". As such, the election would be required to use the 25-ward alignment mandated by Bill 5. Since it was made redundant by the stay, Bill 31 was also withdrawn. The nomination period was reopened as a result of the stay and closed on September 21, 2018.

City Council

Ward 1 Etobicoke North

Ward 2 Etobicoke Centre

Ward 3 Etobicoke—Lakeshore

Ward 4 Parkdale—High Park

Ward 5 York South—Weston

Ward 6 York Centre

Ward 7 Humber River—Black Creek

Ward 8 Eglinton—Lawrence

Ward 9 Davenport

Ward 10 Spadina—Fort York

Ward 11 University—Rosedale

Ward 12 Toronto—St. Paul's

Ward 13 Toronto Centre

Ward 14 Toronto—Danforth

Ward 15 Don Valley West

Ward 16 Don Valley East

Ward 17 Don Valley North

Ward 18 Willowdale

Ward 19 Beaches—East York

Ward 20 Scarborough Southwest

Ward 21 Scarborough Centre

Ward 22 Scarborough—Agincourt

Ward 23 Scarborough North

Ward 24 Scarborough—Guildwood

Ward 25 Scarborough—Rouge Park

Incumbents who did not run for re-election
Justin Di Ciano, Councillor for former Ward 5 since 2014.
Sarah Doucette, Councillor for former Ward 13 since 2010.
Josh Colle, Councillor for former Ward 15 since 2010.
Cesar Palacio, Councillor for former Ward 17 since 2003.
David Shiner, Councillor for former Ward 24 since 2000.
Janet Davis, Councillor for former Ward 31 since 2003.
Mary-Margaret McMahon, Councillor for former Ward 32 since 2010.
Jonathan Tsao, Councillor for former Ward 33 since 2018 (appointed by council to fill a vacancy).
Glenn De Baeremaeker, Councillor for former Ward 38 since 2003.
Migan Megardichian, Councillor for former Ward 41 since 2018 (appointed by council to fill a vacancy).
Jim Hart, Councillor for former Ward 44 since 2017 (appointed by council to fill a vacancy).

References

External links
City of Toronto - Elections

2018
2018 Ontario municipal elections
2018 in Toronto